Domenico Tarcisio Cortese (February 7, 1931 – November 11, 2011) was the Roman Catholic bishop of the Roman Catholic Diocese of Mileto-Nicotera-Tropea, Italy.

Ordained in 1954, Corteso became a bishop in 1979 retiring in 2007.

Notes

Bishops in Calabria
People from the Province of Vibo Valentia
1931 births
2011 deaths